Ivan Ivanov Ivanov (born 27 August 1971 in Shumen) is a Bulgarian former weightlifter and current head coach of the national Bulgarian weightlifting teams. He claimed one gold medal at the 1992 Olympic Games, four time World Champion, and five time European Champion. He won the 1990 World Cup. Ivan also won 1991 World Cup Final in Barcelona and 1990 World Cup Final in Tainan, and in 1989 in Lisbon he finished second. In 1990 he became gold medalist of the Goodwill Games in Seattle. Ivanov was named the Best Weightlifter in the World by the International Weightlifting Federation for 1989 and 1990. Ivanov is also a three-time World Junior Champion and twice European Junior Champion. He was elected as the best coach of Bulgaria for 2019 by the Ministry of Youth and Sports of the country together with the trainer on rhythmic gymnastics Vesela Dimitrova.

Career

Olympics
Ivanov made his Olympic debut at the 1992 Summer Olympics competing in the flyweight division (52 kg). He was the heavy favorite to win the gold medal as the three time reigning World Champion and World Record holder in the clean & jerk and total. After the snatch portion of the competition he was in second place (due to being 0.1 kg heavier than leader Lin Qisheng). Later in the clean & jerk portion, he set a new Olympic Record 150.0 kg in the clean & jerk to claim the gold medal.

In 1996 the IWF restructured the weight classes and Ivanov competed in the newly created 54 kg category. He finished in 7th place after the snatch portion and 6th overall after the clean & jerk portion was completed. His 257.5 kg total was his lowest total of the year and this was the first senior competition he did not win a medal in the overall total lift.

Ivanov qualified for the Bulgarian 2000 Olympic team and actually did compete in the 56 kg category. He won a silver medal but failed the doping test and was disqualified. He testing positive for the banned diuretic furosemide.

Major results

Weightlifting achievements 
 Olympic champion (1992)*
 World Champion (1989, 1990, 1991, 1993)*
 1994 World Championship silver medal*
 1998 World Championships bronze medal*
 European Champion (1989, 1990, 1992, 1993 and 1998)*
 1995 & 2000 European Championships silver medal*
 1999 & 1991 European Championships bronze medal*
 1990 World Cup Winner*
 1993 Athlete of the Balkans*
 1989 & 1990 IWF Weightlifter of the Year*
 1990 Goodwill Games Gold Medalist*
 Junior World Champion (1988, 1989, 1990)*
 Junior European Champion (1988, 1991)*
 Bulgarian Champion (1989, 1991, 1995, 1998, 2000)*

External links 
 Profile
List of stripped Olympic medals
Weightlifting at the 2000 Summer Olympics

References

1971 births
Living people
Bulgarian male weightlifters
Olympic weightlifters of Bulgaria
Weightlifters at the 1992 Summer Olympics
Weightlifters at the 1996 Summer Olympics
Weightlifters at the 2000 Summer Olympics
Olympic gold medalists for Bulgaria
Bulgarian sportspeople in doping cases
Doping cases in weightlifting
Olympic medalists in weightlifting
Competitors stripped of Summer Olympics medals
People from Shumen
Medalists at the 1992 Summer Olympics
World record setters in weightlifting
Goodwill Games medalists in weightlifting
European Weightlifting Championships medalists
World Weightlifting Championships medalists
Competitors at the 1990 Goodwill Games
20th-century Bulgarian people
21st-century Bulgarian people